Brendan Brooks (born November 26, 1978) is a retired Canadian-British professional ice hockey player who last played with Manchester Storm. 

He previously played in the UK for the Sheffield Steelers, Fife Flyers and Braehead Clan. 

He was also formerly a player/assistant coach to head coach John Tripp at Braehead Clan. 

Brooks had rejoined Braehead in June 2017 from the Fife Flyers after playing one season, having dressed for Braehead during 2015–16.

Brooks previously played for Stavanger Oilers in the Norwegian GET-ligaen, but the club was no longer able to finance Brooks' contract and the SCL Tigers in the Swiss National League A. He has formerly played several seasons in AHL and has been contracted to Detroit Red Wings and St. Louis Blues. He is known for his speed and goal scoring capability.

Brooks has also played internationally for Great Britain.

References

External links

1978 births
Living people
Bakersfield Condors (1998–2015) players
Braehead Clan players
Canadian ice hockey centres
Cincinnati Cyclones (IHL) players
Dayton Bombers players
Dornbirn Bulldogs players
ERC Ingolstadt players
Fife Flyers players
Grand Rapids Griffins players
Hamburg Freezers players
Sportspeople from St. Catharines
Iserlohn Roosters players
Lowell Lock Monsters players
Macon Whoopee (ECHL) players
Manchester Monarchs (AHL) players
Manchester Storm (2015–) players
Manitoba Moose players
Mississippi Sea Wolves players
North Bay Centennials players
Owen Sound Platers players
Peoria Rivermen (AHL) players
Peoria Rivermen (ECHL) players
Quad City Mallards (UHL) players
Reading Royals players
SCL Tigers players
Sheffield Steelers players
Stavanger Oilers players
Vålerenga Ishockey players
Worcester IceCats players
Ice hockey people from Ontario
Canadian expatriate ice hockey players in England
Canadian expatriate ice hockey players in Scotland
Canadian expatriate ice hockey players in Norway
Canadian expatriate ice hockey players in Germany
Canadian expatriate ice hockey players in Switzerland
Canadian expatriate ice hockey players in Austria